Rooksey Green is a hamlet in the parish of Preston St Mary, in the Babergh District in the English county of Suffolk.

Other nearby settlements 
Other nearby settlements include the villages of Cockfield, Lavenham and Thorpe Morieux.

References 
 Philip's Street Atlas Suffolk (page 78)

Hamlets in Suffolk
Babergh District